The Cardiff City F.C. Player of the Year award is voted for annually by Cardiff City's supporters, in recognition of the best overall performance by an individual player throughout the football season. The award is set up by the Cardiff City Supporters' Club during the 1997–98 season.

Voting mechanism
The fans of Cardiff City Football Club vote for the Player of the Year. Towards the end of the season, the fans are invited to vote either by post, by the hand where it is handed into the Supporter Club's shop or by e-mail. The fans get three choices and each of their choices get points based on their position on the voting slip, 1st = 3 points, 2nd = 2 points and 3rd = 1 point. The fans can also vote for the Young Player of the Year as well.

List of winners
Players in bold are still at the club.

Summary of wins by nationality

Young Player of the Year
Players in bold are still at the club.

Footnotes
Caps are correct to when the player won the award.
During the 2009–10 season, no presentations took place, but Peter Whittingham was handed the 2010 Player of the Year the following year.

References

Player of the Year